The South African Railways Class 16 4-6-2 of 1914 was a steam locomotive.

In 1914, the South African Railways placed twelve Class 16 steam locomotives with a  Pacific type wheel arrangement in passenger train service.

Manufacturer
The Class 16 4-6-2 Pacific type passenger locomotive was designed by D.A. Hendrie, Chief Mechanical Engineer (CME) of the South African Railways (SAR) from 1910 to 1922. It was built by the North British Locomotive Company in Glasgow, Scotland, who delivered twelve locomotives in 1914, numbered in the range from 790 to 801.

Characteristics

The design of the Class 16 closely followed that of Hendrie's Class 15 4-8-2 Mountain type which was introduced at the same time from the same builders and many parts were made interchangeable.

The cylinders were arranged outside the plate frames, with the piston valves above the cylinders and actuated by Walschaerts valve gear. The boilers were equipped with superheaters and had Belpaire fireboxes. The engines were delivered new with Type MP1 tenders with a  coal capacity and a  water capacity.

Power comparison
When it was built in 1914, the Class 16 was considered to be a very large and powerful express locomotive, even when compared to British locomotives which were built to run on  broad gauge. As built, with  diameter coupled wheels, the ratio of wheel diameter to rail gauge was the same as that of a broad gauge locomotive with  diameter coupled wheels. This made the Class 16 the most powerful express passenger locomotive design yet to have been built in Great Britain at the time.

Watson Standard boilers
During the 1930s, many serving locomotives were reboilered with a standard boiler type designed by A.G. Watson, CME of the SAR from 1929 to 1936, as part of his standardisation policy. Such Watson Standard reboilered locomotives were reclassified by adding an "R" suffix to their classification.

Eventually all twelve Class 16 locomotives were reboilered with Watson Standard no. 2B boilers and reclassified to Class 16R. Early conversions were equipped with copper and later conversions with steel fireboxes. In the process, they were also equipped with Watson cabs with their distinctive slanted fronts, compared to the conventional vertical fronts of their original cabs.

Their original Belpaire boilers were fitted with Ramsbottom safety valves, while the Watson Standard boiler was fitted with Pop safety valves. An obvious visual difference between an original and a Watson Standard reboilered locomotive is usually a rectangular regulator cover, just to the rear of the chimney on the reboilered locomotive. In the case of the Class 16 and Class 16R locomotives, two even more obvious differences are the Watson cab and the absence of the Belpaire firebox hump between the cab and boiler on the reboilered locomotives.

Service
The Class 16 was intended for fast passenger trains in Transvaal, the Orange Free State and the upper sections of Natal where the gradients were not as severe. They were placed in suburban passenger service, working between Pretoria and Johannesburg, and in mainline service on the section from Johannesburg to Volksrust on the line to Natal. In later years, after being withdrawn from mainline passenger service, many of these locomotives remained employed in suburban passenger working and shunting service.

Preservation

Illustration
The main picture shows Class 16 no. 800 at Braamfontein c. 1930, as built with a Belpaire firebox and Type MP1 tender, on interurban service with a destination board for Pretoria below its headlight.

References

1880
1880
1880
4-6-2 locomotives
2′C1′ h2 locomotives
NBL locomotives
Cape gauge railway locomotives
Railway locomotives introduced in 1914
1914 in South Africa
Scrapped locomotives